Park Jeong-hui (born 3 October 1966) is a South Korean judoka. He competed in the men's lightweight event at the 1988 Summer Olympics.

Park attended Keisung High School, and competed for his school at the 22nd President's Cup Judo Championships in Seoul, where he won a gold medal in the 71 kg class. He went on to attend Korea Physical Science College (now Yong In University), and represented South Korea in judo at the 1985 Summer Universiade and the  tournament while a student there.

References

1966 births
Living people
South Korean male judoka
Olympic judoka of South Korea
Judoka at the 1988 Summer Olympics
Place of birth missing (living people)